Pert Near Sandstone is a bluegrass/newgrass band from Minneapolis/St. Paul, Minnesota, and part of the Minnesota Roots Music scene that includes contemporaries Charlie Parr, Trampled By Turtles, and 4onthefloor. Pert Near Sandstone has recorded six full-length albums since 2004, and have toured the United States extensively. Former full-time member (and now collaborator) Ryan Young plays fiddle with Trampled By Turtles. Dave Simonett of Trampled By Turtles has cited Pert Near Sandstone as one of his favorite contemporary bluegrass acts in the United States.  
Pert Near Sandstone have shared the stage with many legendary musical talents such as Ralph Stanley, Del McCoury, Steve Martin and the Steep Canyon Rangers, Wilco, and Yonder Mountain Stringband.

In a May 27, 2012 opinion piece in the Minneapolis Star Tribune, "Pert Near Sandstone" and "Trampled By Turtles" were singled out as examples of terrible Minnesota band names.

Notable accomplishments
In 2008 they performed on A Prairie Home Companion.
In 2010 they won the Band Competition at Yonder Mountain String Band's Northwest String Summit at Horning's Hideout in North Plains, Oregon.
Pert Near Sandstone's cover of the Beatles song I Am the Walrus from the album Minnesota Beatle Project, Volume 2 (2010) was inducted into Minnesota Public Radio’s (89.3 The Current) Chart Show Hall of Fame in 2011 following 12 weeks on the Top 20 list: 10 of these weeks in the top 5, and 5 weeks at No. 1. This benefit album and particularly this song received positive press both locally and nationally.
The 2011 album "Paradise Hop" was positively received by both local and national press, including the Minneapolis Star Tribune, the City Pages, the roots music magazine No Depression, and The Onion's AV Club.
The week of November 13–19, 2011, the album "Paradise Hop" was ranked No. 7 on bluegrass downloads at the internet site eMusic.
Their song "Solid Gone" was in the top 10 of Minnesota Public Radio's "The Chart Show" for four weeks in November–December 2011, and was No. 25 on The Troubadour's Road Top 25 Songs of 2011.
In 2012, Pert Near Sandstone contributed a track to the compilation "We Love to Be Free: Songs of Life and Love in Support of Freedom to Marry" to support the rejection of a constitutional amendment to ban same-sex marriages in the state of Minnesota. To celebrate the rejection of this ballot initiative, Senator Amy Klobuchar introduced the band at their November 9, 2012 show at First Avenue in Minneapolis.
On New Year's Day 2013, the Washington DC-based radio station WAMU listed Pert Near Sandstone's session on Bluegrass Country as one of the top 21 sessions of 2012.
On January 14, 2013, an article at the Denver Post hailed the upcoming Pert Near Sandstone album as one of the most anticipated bluegrass albums of 2013.
Since 2015, Pert Near Sandstone has curated the Blue Ox Music Festival, featuring artists such as Bela Fleck and the Flecktones, Jason Isbell & the 400 Unit, Old Crow Medicine Show, and many more.
On June 4, 2020, an article from Bluegrass Today referred to Pert Near Sandstone as representing "the essence of Minnesota’s thriving progressive bluegrass community."

Discography
Full-length albums
Live: Just Outside of Sandstone (2005)
Up and Down the River (2007)
Needle & Thread (2008)
Out On A Spree (2009)
Paradise Hop (2011)
The Hardest Part of Leaving (2014)
Discovery of Honey (2016)
Rising Tide (2020)

Singles
Ship of Fools (2013; limited edition 7" vinyl and CD, featuring the songs "Ship of Fools" and "Be Here". Simultaneous release of the "Ship of Fools" music video.)
Good Times (2017)
Castles in the Air (2020)
Kings and Clowns (2020)

Compilations
Minnesota Beatle Project Volume 2 (2010; Vega Productions. CD and LP. Track 9: I Am The Walrus)
Old Stage Tapes (2010, CD. Track 14: Baltimore Fire)
Minnesota Beatle Project Volume 3 (2011; Vega Productions. CD and LP. Nate Sipe contributes to Track 6: I've Got a Feeling, with Ryan Young and others.)
American Buffalo (2012; Noiseland Industries. LP. Record Store Day release, limited to 500 copies and distributed free with purchase at participating record stores in the Twin Cities. Pert Near plays Track 15; album version of "Save Me" from 2011's Paradise Hop.)

Guest Appearances
Live Humdinger by the Minneapolis roots band The Brass Kings. (2010; CD. A Live album recorded at The Cedar Cultural Center. Nate Sipe supports.)

Demo Tape
Winter Fades (2004, out of print. Nine tracks of traditionals and covers of Peter Rowan, Nick Drake, Jimmie Rodgers, Elizabeth Cotton, and Ween). Featured the original four members of Nate Sipe, J. Lenz, Kevin Kniebel, and Ryan Young.

References

External links 
 Pert Near Sandstone home page
 Minnesota Monthly Magazine feature article (August 2006)

American bluegrass music groups